Sensitive skin is a skin condition in which skin is prone to itching and irritation experienced as a subjective sensation when using cosmetics and toiletries.  When questioned, over 50% of women in the UK and US, and 38% of men, report that they have sensitive skin.

See also
 Contact dermatitis
 List of cutaneous conditions

References

Further reading
 

 

Skin anatomy